Yelahanka Assembly constituency is one of the 225 constituencies in the Karnataka Legislative Assembly of Karnataka a south state of India. Yelahanka is also part of Chikballapur Lok Sabha constituency.

Members of Legislative Assembly

See also
 Yelahanka
 Bangalore Urban district
 List of constituencies of Karnataka Legislative Assembly

References

 

Assembly constituencies of Karnataka
Bangalore Urban district